Oriini is a tribe of minute pirate bugs in the family Anthocoridae. There are about 6 genera and more than 60 described species in Oriini.

Genera
These six genera belong to the tribe Oriini:
 Macrothacheliella Champion, 1900
 Macrotracheliella Champion, 1900
 Montandionola Poppius, 1909
 Montandoniola Poppius, 1909
 Orius Wolff, 1811
 Paratriphleps Champion, 1900

References

Further reading

External links

 

Anthocoridae
Articles created by Qbugbot